The Stewards' Cup is a Hong Kong Thoroughbred horse race held annually during the latter part of January at Sha Tin Racecourse. A Group One race that offers a purse of HK$12,000,000, it is run on turf over a distance of 1600 meters and is open to horses three years of age and older. The first leg of the Hong Kong Triple Crown, it is followed by the Hong Kong Gold Cup in February. and the Hong Kong Champions & Chater Cup in late May/early June.

Winners since 1994

See also
 List of Hong Kong horse races

References
Racing Post:
 The Hong Kong Jockey Club official website of The Stewards' Cup (2011/12)
 Racing Information of The Stewards' Cup (2011/12)
 The Hong Kong Jockey Club 

Horse races in Hong Kong
Open mile category horse races
Triple Crown of Thoroughbred Racing